Roaring Six Guns is a 1937 American Western film directed by J. P. McGowan and written by Arthur Everett. The film stars Kermit Maynard, Mary Hayes, Sam Flint, John Merton, Budd Buster, Robert Fiske and Ed Cassidy. The film was released on September 1, 1937, by Ambassador Pictures.

Roaring Six Guns is the last of Kermit Maynard's starring roles; he starred in 18 films for Ambassador Pictures from 1935 to 1937. After this movie, he resumed doing stunt work and acting in supporting roles.

Plot

Cast           
Kermit Maynard as Buck Sinclair
Mary Hayes as Beth Ringold
Sam Flint as George Ringold
John Merton as Mileaway Roberts
Budd Buster as Wildcat Roper
Robert Fiske as Jake Harmon 
Ed Cassidy as Commissioner
Curley Dresden	as Slug 
Dick Morehead as Bill
Slim Whitaker as Skeeter 
Earle Hodgins as Sundown

References

External links
 

1937 films
American Western (genre) films
1937 Western (genre) films
Films directed by J. P. McGowan
Films based on works by James Oliver Curwood
American black-and-white films
1930s English-language films
1930s American films